Romanovich or Romanowicz (Polish version) is a gender-neutral Slavic surname and a patronymic name.

Surname

Romanovich
Anatoli Romanovich (born 1979), Russian association football player
Daniel Romanovich (1201-1246, Papal archbishop
Mstislav Romanovich, Russian noble
Nikita Romanovich  (1522–1586), Muscovite boyar
Sergei Romanovich (footballer) (born 1984), Russian association football player
Vasilko Romanovich (1203–1269), Russian prince

Romanowicz
Aleksander Romanowicz (1871–1933), Russian general of cavalry in both Russian Imperial Army and Polish Army
Barbara Romanowicz (born 1950), French geophysicist
Roger Romanowicz (born 1947), Australian association football player
Walter Romanowicz (1918–1986), American association football goalkeeper

Patronymic name
Andrei Chikatilo (1936-1994), prolific Russian serial killer
Anton Romanovich Zhebrak (1901-1965), Russian professor 
Aleks Matsukatov (born 1999), Russian football player
Alexander Belyaev (1884-1942), Russian science fiction writer
Alexander Romanovich Bruce (1704-1760), Russian lieutenant general
Alexander Dovzhenko (psychiatrist) (1918-1955), Russian psychiatrist
Alexander Drenteln (1820-1888), Russian general
Alexander Luria (1902-1977), Russian neuropsychologist
Alexander Vorontsov (1741-1805), Russian chancellor
Alexandre Prigogine (1913-1991), Russian-born Belgian mineralogist  
Arkadiy Abramovich (born 1993), Russian businessman 
Arkady Rotenberg (born 1951), Russian billionaire businessman 
Berthold Lubetkin (1901-1990), Russian architect 
Boris Romanovich Rotenberg (born 1957), Russian businessman, brother of Arkady
Borys Hmyria (1903-1969), Russian singer
Constantin Bakaleinikoff (1896-1966), Russian-born American composer
Daniil Lunts (1912-1977), Russian KGB agent
Prince Dimitri Romanov (1926-2016), Russian prince
Frol Kozlov (1908-1965), Russian politician
Gavrila Derzhavin (1743-1816), Russian poet
Grigory Ginzburg (1904-1961), Russian pianist
Igor Lifanov (born 1965), Russian actor
Ilya Prigogine (1917-2003), Russian physical chemist
Ivan Tarkhanov (physiologist) (1846-1908), Georgian physiologist
Konstantin Eiges (1875-1950), Russian composer
Kuzma Sinilov (1902-1957), Russian lieutenant general
Lev Britanishsky (1897-1971), Russian painter
Maksim Borisko (born 2000), Russian football player
Mikhail Perlman (1923-2002), Russian gymnast
Mischa Bakaleinikoff (1890-1960), Russian director
Nicholas Romanov, Prince of Russia (1922-2014), Russian claimant of the House of  Romanov
Pavel Popovich (1930-2009), Russian cosmonaut 
Pyotr Romanovich Bagration (1818-1876), Russian-Georgian statesman 
Semyon Vorontsov (1744-1832), Russian diplomat
Roman Kachanov (film director) (born 1967), Russian film director
Roman Rosen (1847-1921), Russian diplomat
Ruslan Litvinov (born 2001), Russian football player
Vasilije Romanovich (c.1700-1773), Russian icon painter
Vladimir Alekno (born 1966), Russian volleyball coach and former player
Vladimir Romanovich Arsenyev (1948-2010), Russian africanist 
Yegor Spiridonov (born 2001), Russian ice hockey forward
Yevgeny Grishin (speed skater) (1931-2005), Russian speedskater

Fictional

Patronymic name
Andrej Evilenko, character of Evilenko (based on Andrei Chikatilo)
Rodion Raskolnikov, character of Crime and Punishment

Surnames of Russian origin
Surnames of Polish origin
Patronymic surnames